The 2022 OFC Champions League group stage was be played from 4 to 11 August 2022. A total of 8 teams has competed in the group stage to decide the four places in the knockout stage of the 2022 OFC Champions League.

Draw
The draw of the group stage were announced by the OFC on 30 June 2022. The 8 teams were drawn into two groups of four.

Format
The four teams in each group played each other on a round-robin basis at a centralised venue, Ngahue Reserve, Auckland. The winners and runners-up of each group advanced to the semi-finals of the knockout stage.

Schedule
Matches were played on the following dates and venues:
Group matches were played between 4–11 August 2022 in New Zealand.
The schedule of each matchday was as follows.

Groups

Group A
All times were local, NZT (UTC+12).

Group B
All times were local, NZT (UTC+12).

References

External links
OFC Champions League 2020, oceaniafootball.com

2
August 2022 sports events in New Zealand
International association football competitions hosted by New Zealand